William Anderson (1852–1908) was a United States Navy sailor and a recipient of the United States military's highest decoration, the Medal of Honor.

Biography
Born in 1852 in Sweden, Anderson migrated to the United States and joined the Navy from New York. On that day, he rescued First Class Boy W. H. Moffatt from drowning, for which he was awarded the Medal of Honor.

Anderson's official Medal of Honor citation reads:
On board the U.S.S. Powhatan, 28 June 1878. Acting courageously, Anderson rescued from drowning W. H. Moffatt, first class boy.

See also

List of Medal of Honor recipients in non-combat incidents

References

External links

1852 births
1908 deaths
Swedish emigrants to the United States
United States Navy sailors
United States Navy Medal of Honor recipients
Foreign-born Medal of Honor recipients
Non-combat recipients of the Medal of Honor